Streamwood is a village in Cook County, Illinois, United States. Per the 2020 census, the population was 39,577. It is a northwest suburb of Chicago, and is a part of the Chicago metropolitan area.

Streamwood is one of the three communities that make up the so-called "Tri Village" area, along with Bartlett and Hanover Park. Streamwood was first incorporated as a village on February 9, 1957.

Retail and commerce
A major retail sector has developed in recent years at the intersection of Illinois Route 59 and Illinois Route 19 called Sutton Park, which includes the Sutton Park Shopping Center.

Geography
Streamwood is located at  (42.020627, -88.173409).

Demographics
As of the 2020 census there were 39,577 people, 13,170 households, and 9,839 families residing in the village. The racial makeup of the village was 46.61% White, 5.93% African American, 1.70% Native American, 16.03% Asian, 0.02% Pacific Islander, 16.31% from other races, and 13.40% from two or more races. Hispanic or Latino of any race were 33.77% of the population.

There were 13,170 households, out of which 59.51% had children under the age of 18 living with them, 58.73% were married couples living together, 10.38% had a female householder with no husband present, and 25.29% were non-families. 21.54% of all households were made up of individuals, and 6.74% had someone living alone who was 65 years of age or older. The average household size was 3.51 and the average family size was 3.01.

The village's age distribution consisted of 22.8% under the age of 18, 8.0% from 18 to 24, 29.5% from 25 to 44, 25.9% from 45 to 64, and 13.6% who were 65 years of age or older. The median age was 38.2 years. For every 100 females, there were 98.5 males. For every 100 females age 18 and over, there were 105.7 males.

The median income for a household in the village was $88,917, and the median income for a family was $97,537. Males had a median income of $43,367 versus $33,410 for females. The per capita income for the village was $31,692. About 4.3% of families and 6.8% of the population were below the poverty line, including 6.9% of those under age 18 and 4.3% of those age 65 or over.

Note: the US Census treats Hispanic/Latino as an ethnic category. This table excludes Latinos from the racial categories and assigns them to a separate category. Hispanics/Latinos can be of any race.

Schools
The village is primarily served by a unified school district, Elgin Area School District U46, the second largest school district in Illinois. A small subdivision east of Barrington Road is served by School District 54 (Kindergarten through Junior High) and Township District 211 (High school.) The village is also served by and falls entirely within the boundaries of the Elgin Community College District.
District U-46
Township District 211
District 54
Elgin Community College District 509 (known commonly as ECC)

The village is also one of the locations of Northwest Academy, a private therapeutic day school serving special education students from school districts within a  radius.

Parks and libraries
The village is primarily served by the Poplar Creek Library District and the Streamwood Park District. Residents east of Barrington Road are served by the Schaumburg Township District Library and the Schaumburg Park District. Residents who live west of Rt. 59 are served by the Gail Borden Public Library District in Elgin.
 Poplar Creek Public Library
Renner Academic Library at Elgin Community College
Schaumburg Township District Library
 Streamwood Park District
 Schaumburg Park District
 Gail Borden Library

Places of worship
Streamwood is home to a diverse variety of places of worship across various religious denomination, including, but not limited to :
 Faith Missionary Baptist Church
 Immanuel United Church of Christ
 Grace Bible Church
 Grace Lutheran Church
 Mercy Community Church
 New Hope Community
 St. John the Evangelist Catholic Church
 The Church in Streamwood
 Truelight Lutheran Church
 Christ Community Church
Baitul Ilm
Shree Swaminarayan Gadi Temple Midwest Chicago
Madhav Kendra (Temporarily Closed)
Awana - Headquarters of the international evangelical Christian nonprofit organization in child and youth discipleship.

Streamwood Stride
The Streamwood Stride is an endurance race. It is held in Streamwood on the second weekend of June. The 2010 Streamwood Stride was its 12th race, and included the 5k run/walk, the 10k run, kiddie races of 50m and 100m, the double derby (which is Streamwood Stride teamed up with Bartlett Blossom Run), and the  fun run.

References

External links

Village of Streamwood official website
Streamwood Chamber of Commerce

 
Villages in Illinois
Chicago metropolitan area
Villages in Cook County, Illinois
Populated places established in 1957
1957 establishments in Illinois
Majority-minority cities and towns in Cook County, Illinois